F2: Fun and Frustration is a 2019 Indian Telugu-language comedy film written and directed by Anil Ravipudi. Produced by Sri Venkateswara Creations, the film stars Venkatesh, Varun Tej, Tamannaah, and Mehreen Pirzada. The music is composed by Devi Sri Prasad. The plot follows two men who try to control their dominating wives after getting married.

F2 was released on 12 January 2019 during Sankranthi, and grossed over 127.2–140 crore against a budget of 30 crore, becoming a major commercial success. F2 was featured in the Indian Panorama Mainstream section of the 50th International Film Festival of India. 

It is the first film in the Fun and Frustration series with a standalone sequel titled F3: Fun and Frustration released in May 2022.

Plot
In the Czech Republic, Venky and Varun are apprehended by Police for abusing two women. Interrogated by Indian Embassy official Vishwanath, Venky and Varun reveal that the women who filed a case against them are his wife and girlfriend respectively much to Vishwanath's surprise. Curious, Vishwanath asks them about their past. Venky was an orphan with high dreams about marriage and works as PA to MLA Anji Reddy but earns handsomely. Through a marriage bureau, Venky happened to meet Harika, a software engineer who lives with her parents, sister Honey, paternal and maternal grandmothers Ganga and Manga. Happy that Venky is an orphan and since Harika would not have any problem with in-laws that women generally face, the family accepted for marriage. Venky and Harika marry happily. However, they began to have arguments over petty issues and Venky began to feel tormented. Their neighbor Prasad, who showcased his love for his wife publicly added up to Harika's jealousy and Venky's problems. Unable to live in a hostel, Honey began to live with Harika and Venky and created problems between them when Venky tried to tell Harika that Honey has a boyfriend. 

Varun starts to narrate his story: Varun is Honey's boyfriend and runs a hotel. Venky saw Honey hugging Varun and told Harika and her family but they refused to believe him. He challenged them that he would expose Honey one day and Harika and her family promised to be slaves for him if he does. Venky succeeded in doing so and was unwilling to be tormented by a vengeful Venky, Harika and her mother lied that they already knew about Honey's relationship and were just testing him by challenging him. Despite Venky's warning about the side effects of marriage and Honey, Varun proceeded to have an engagement. Venky exposed Prasad's second wife (Swarna) to his first wife as an act of revenge for tormenting him. Within six days, Varun faced problems managing Honey and his mother Kanthamma who have issues with each other. Frustrated, Varun agreed with Venky. Prasad joined them and theorized that women need husbands. To teach their wives a lesson, Venky, Varun, and Prasad escape to Europe. Honey and Harika were shattered on the former's wedding day when they found Varun and Venky missing. 

Venky, Varun, and Prasad enjoyed their lives in Europe. One day, Honey and Harika saw them in Europe and requested them to come back but they mocked and insulted them. Honey and Harika left the place cursing them. Venky, Varun, and Prasad gatecrashed a party hosted by influential businessman Dora Swamy Naidu on the occasion of his sons' fixed marriages. Venky and Varun were stunned to know that Harika and Honey are the brides of Dora Swamy Naidu's sons. Dora Swamy Naidu believes that a home would be peaceful if the family's sons are married to sisters, who would act peacefully by being sisters with each other. Dora Swamy Naidu's wife and his elder brother Ramaswamy Naidu's wife are sisters too. Doraswamy Naidu had previously broken his elder son's marriage with Anasuya when the latter's sister refused to marry his younger son. When Honey and Harika refused to return to Varun and Venky, they were challenged to stop the marriage. Impersonating themselves as writers willing to write a biography of Doraswamy Naidu, Venky and Varun enter his house and tried several methods to stop the marriage but their attempts are thwarted by Harika and Honey. 

Frustrated as Honey and Harika get engaged, Varun and Venky get drunk and create a scene. Doraswamy Naidu had them arrested and revealed that Honey and Harika revealed the truth to him long ago. After listening to their story, Vishwanath takes Venky, Prasad, and Varun to his house and introduced them to his wife Lakshmi, with whom he shares a cordial relationship. Vishwanath lectures the trio that husbands are supposed to understand their wives, who are continuously ignored by them but still love their husbands whereas the latter always feel troubled rather. Realizing their mistakes, Venky and Varun are resolute to reconcile with their respective partners. They gatecrash Honey and Harika's Sangeet party with Anasuya, who convinced her younger sister to marry Doraswamy Naidu's younger son. However, the discussion comes to a halt when John Snow, Anasuya's brother has Doraswamy Naidu, Harika and Honey kidnapped as an act of revenge unaware of the scenario that happened. 

John takes the trio onto a weak bridge unaware of its condition where everyone reaches and John realizes what happened at the Sangeet Party. Harika and Honey still refuse to reconcile with Venky and Varun. The bridge starts to collapse. Harika and Honey go onto the safe side while Venky, Varun, and others remain trapped. Harika and Honey give in when Venky and Varun attempt to commit suicide and reveal that they had sent Anasuya to them and always wanted them to realize. Venky and Varun go to the safer side by using the  Caution board as a bridge. However, the board falls into the river when the others trapped on the bridge fight about who has to go first. Venky, Varun, Harika, and Honey leave while the trapped people wait for the rescue team to come.

Cast

Production 
Principal photography began on 27 June 2018.

Music 

The music is composed by Devi Sri Prasad, marking his first collaboration with Anil Ravipudi, and the lyrics were written by Sri Mani, Balaji, and Kasarla Shyam. Audio rights to the film were purchased by Aditya Music. A video teaser of "Rechipodham Brother" was released on 19 December 2018, and the lyrical video was released a day later on 20 December 2018. The second single track, "Entho Fun" sung by Devi Sri Prasad was released on 26 December 2018. The third single track "Honey is the Best" was released on 29 December 2018. The audio launch event took place on 30 December 2018, at RK Beach in Vishakapatnam.

Release

Theatrical
F2: Fun and Frustration was released in the Telugu language worldwide on 12 January 2019 coinciding with the Sankranthi weekend. The film was dubbed and released in Hindi, Tamil, and Malayalam under the same title.

Home media
The film was dubbed into Hindi and released on 14 July 2019 by Aditya Movies.

Reception

Box office
F2 grossed ₹17.2 crore on opening day in Andhra Pradesh and Telangana, and ₹22 crore in India. By the third weekend, the film grossed $2 million at the United States box office, and by the end of its full theatrical run, it grossed more than 185 crore worldwide and wound up as one of the highest grossing Telugu film of 2019.

Critical response 
Y Sunita Chowdhary of The Hindu wrote: "This family drama’s appeal stems from good casting. Venkatesh plays his comic part to perfection consistently and capitalizes on Ravipudi’s dialogues with great timing and flourish. One is reminded of his glorious projects in the past. Varun Tej also impresses."

Firstpost gave 3.5 out of 5 stars and stated "F2 manages to entertain quite a lot and it's well-intentioned. It wants men to understand the importance of saying ‘sorry’ and ‘I love you’ when it matters the most. In the film, Venky and Varun might have learned their lesson the hard way, but they do unravel the secret to a life of happiness — that you don’t have to learn Venky Aasan, but just follow what Pradeep says right from the beginning till the end — Anthega Anthega".

The Times of India gave 2.5 out of 5 stars and said "Give it a go for Venkatesh, who saves this film from sinking into oblivion. But give it a cold hard miss if outdated humor and gender tropes are not your cups of tea."

Sequel 

After the success of F2, Ravipudi and Raju planned a sequel named F3. The film was scheduled to release on 27 August 2021 but postponed due to the COVID-19 pandemic. Finally F3  is released on 27 May 2022.

References

External links 
 

 2010s Telugu-language films
 Films scored by Devi Sri Prasad
 Films shot in Hyderabad, India
 Films shot at Ramoji Film City
 Films shot in Prague
 2019 films
 Films directed by Anil Ravipudi
Sri Venkateswara Creations films
[[Digital Streaming Partner: Amazon Prime Video